David Phillips may refer to:

Arts and entertainment
David Graham Phillips (1867–1911), American writer
David Phillips (cinematographer) (c.1956–2017), American cinematographer 
David Phillips (actor) (born 1978), Canadian actor and host
David Phillips (screenwriter) (born 1978), American author and screenwriter of Sahara
David Phillips (CSI), a fictional character in the American crime drama CSI: Crime Scene Investigation
David Phillips (sculptor) (born 1944), American sculptor

Science
David Chilton Phillips (1924–1999), British biologist
David Phillips (chemist) (born 1939), British photochemist, President of the Royal Society of Chemistry and science broadcaster
David Phillips (climatologist) (born 1944), Environment Canada climatologist
David Phillips (entrepreneur) (born 1964), American civil engineer best known for acquiring 1,253,000 frequent flyer miles by purchasing thousands of cups of pudding
David Phillips (sociologist), sociologist who coined the term "Werther effect"

Sports
David Phillips (footballer) (born 1963), Wales international footballer
David Phillips (soccer) (born 1966), Canadian international soccer player
David Phillips (gymnast) (born 1977), New Zealand gymnast
Dave Phillips (ice hockey) (born 1987), British ice hockey player

Other
David Atlee Phillips (1922–1988), CIA agent
David L. Phillips (born 1938), Massachusetts politician
David Wendell Phillips (born 1962), technology lawyer and angel investor
David Phillips (police officer) (born 1944), British police officer

See also 
Dave Phillips (disambiguation)